Listed below are the dates and results for the 2002 FIFA World Cup qualification rounds for UEFA teams.

The European section of the 2002 FIFA World Cup qualification acted as qualifiers for the 2002 FIFA World Cup, which is being held in South Korea and Japan, for national teams which are members of the UEFA. Apart from France, who qualified automatically as defending champions, a total of 13.5 slots in the final tournament were available for UEFA teams.

The 50 teams were divided into nine groups, five groups of six teams and four groups of five teams. The teams played against each other on a home-and-away basis. The group winners would qualify. Among the runners-up, Group 2 was drawn randomly to advance to the UEFA–AFC Intercontinental play-off while the remaining eight runners-up would advance to the UEFA play-offs.

In the play-offs, the eight teams were paired up to play knockout matches on a home-and-away basis. The four aggregate winners qualified. The qualifying process started on 2 September 2000, after UEFA Euro 2000, and ended on 14 November 2001.

Qualification seeding (UEFA)
The draw was made in December 1999, and was based on average points per game achieved in 1998 FIFA World Cup qualification and UEFA Euro 2000 qualifying. France qualified automatically as title holders, and because Belgium and Netherlands, as hosts, had not had to qualify for UEFA Euro 2000, only their 1998 World Cup result was used. Andorra made their debut in World Cup qualifying.

Teams in bold eventually qualified for the final tournament, teams in bold italic qualified for the final tournament through the play-offs, and teams in italic participated in the play-offs but did not qualify for the final tournament.

Summary
Table - top row: group winners, second row: group runners-up, third row: others. The winner of each group qualified for the 2002 FIFA World Cup together with winners of play-off. Group 2 was the last team drawn for its runner-up to participate in the UEFA/AFC intercontinental play-off. As runner-up in group 2, Republic of Ireland played a play-off against a team from the AFC confederation, whereas the others played against each other (UEFA play-off).

First round
The winner of each group qualified directly, the runner-up advanced to play-off (either UEFA playoff or UEFA-AFC playoff).

Group 1

Group 2

Group 3

Group 4

Group 5

Group 6

Group 7

Group 8

Group 9

Play-offs 
The draw for the play-offs was held on 31 August 2001 at FIFA's headquarters in Zürich, Switzerland. The nine group runners-up were placed into one pot, with eight teams drawn into four pairings (with the first team drawn hosting the first leg). The remaining team then faced an AFC team in the inter-confederation play-offs. UEFA were paired to face the AFC team by decision of the FIFA Executive Committee in October 1999.

UEFA

Belgium qualified by the aggregate score of 2–0.

Germany qualified by the aggregate score of 5–2.

Slovenia qualified by the aggregate score of 3–2.

Turkey qualified by the aggregate score of 6–0.

Inter-confederation play-offs

As the Group 2 runner-up was the last team to be selected in the play-off draw on 31 August 2001, that team then faced an AFC team in the inter-confederation play-offs. UEFA were paired to face the AFC team by decision of the FIFA Executive Committee in October 1999, though the order of legs was decided by the draw on 31 August 2001. The team to meet an AFC team became the Republic of Ireland.

Qualified teams
The following 15 teams from UEFA qualified for the final tournament.

1 Bold indicates champions for that year. Italic indicates hosts for that year.
2 Competed as Soviet Union.
3 Competed as West Germany. A separate team for East Germany also participated in qualifications during this time, having only competed in 1974.

Goalscorers
There were 594 goals scored in 240 matches (including 2 international play-offs), for an average of 2.48 goals per match.
10 goals

 Andriy Shevchenko

9 goals

 Ebbe Sand

8 goals

 Emmanuel Olisadebe
 Pauleta
 Henrik Larsson

7 goals

 Marc Wilmots
 Filippo Inzaghi
 Nuno Gomes
 Vladimir Beschastnykh
 Kubilay Türkyilmaz

6 goals

 Michalis Konstantinou
 Michael Owen
 Michael Ballack
 Ruud Van Nistelrooy
 Luís Figo
 Hakan Şükür
 Savo Milošević

5 goals

 Raman Vasilyuk
 Dimitar Berbatov
 Boško Balaban
 Pavel Nedvěd
 Alessandro Del Piero
 Patrick Kluivert
 John Carew
 Radosław Kałużny
 Marcus Allbäck
 Alexander Frei
 Mateja Kežman

4 goals

 Andi Herzog
 Bob Peeters
 Jon Dahl Tomasson
 Mikael Forssell
 Aleksandr Iashvili
 Ian Harte
 Roy Keane
 David Healy
 Sérgio Conceição
 Marius Niculae
 Szilárd Németh
 Zlatko Zahovič
 Raúl
 John Hartson

3 goals

 Arthur Petrosyan
 Michael Baur
 Alexander Khatskevich
 Bart Goor
 Gert Verheyen
 Elvir Baljić
 Sergej Barbarez
 Georgi Ivanov
 Ioannis Okkas
 Milan Baroš
 Dennis Rommedahl
 David Beckham
 Andres Oper
 Aki Riihilahti
 Marko Rehmer
 Miklós Fehér
 Ferenc Horváth
 Eyjólfur Sverrisson
 Matt Holland
 Jimmy Floyd Hasselbaink
 Clarence Seedorf
 Mark Van Bommel
 Pierre Van Hooijdonk
 Marcin Żewłakow
 João Vieira Pinto
 Yegor Titov
 Billy Dodds
 Igor Demo
 Milenko Ačimovič
 Milan Osterc
 Fernando Hierro
 Gaizka Mendieta
 Anders Svensson
 Okan Buruk
 Alpay Özalan

2 goals

 Ildefons Lima
 Thomas Flögel
 Vadim Vasilyev
 Valentin Belkevich
 Mikalay Ryndzyuk
 Émile Mpenza
 Yves Vanderhaeghe
 Krasimir Chomakov
 Martin Petrov
 Alen Bokšić
 Robert Prosinečki
 Davor Vugrinec
 Marios Agathokleous
 Jan Koller
 Pavel Kuka
 Marek Jankulovski
 Vratislav Lokvenc
 Tomáš Rosický
 Thomas Gravesen
 Paul Scholes
 Martin Reim
 Indrek Zelinski
 Jari Litmanen
 Temuri Ketsbaia
 Sebastian Deisler
 Carsten Jancker
 Miroslav Klose
 Angelos Charisteas
 Attila Korsós
 János Mátyus
 Vilmos Sebők
 Ríkharður Daðason
 Þórður Guðjónsson
 Eiður Guðjohnsen
 Tryggvi Guðmundsson
 Richard Dunne
 Robbie Keane
 Kevin Kilbane
 Mark Kinsella
 Jason McAteer
 Haim Revivo
 Marco Delvecchio
 Francesco Totti
 Marians Pahars
 Gjorgji Hristov
 Artim Šakiri
 Serghei Cleşcenco
 Marc Overmars
 Philip Mulryne
 Bård Borgersen
 Ole Gunnar Solskjær
 Bartosz Karwan
 Paweł Kryszałowicz
 Pedro Barbosa
 Cosmin Contra
 Adrian Ilie
 Dmitri Khokhlov
 Andy Selva
 Colin Hendry
 Peter Németh
 Nastja Čeh
 Željko Milinovič
 Gerard López
 Fernando Morientes
 Diego Tristán
 Stéphane Chapuisat
 Arif Erdem
 Andriy Vorobei
 Hennadiy Zubov
 Nathan Blake
 Slaviša Jokanović
 Siniša Mihajlović
 Predrag Mijatović
 Dejan Stanković

1 goal

 Alban Bushi
 Ervin Fakaj
 Bledar Kola
 Edvin Murati
 Altin Rraklli
 Emiliano González Arqués
 Roberto Jonas
 Justo Ruiz
 Hayk Hakobyan
 Felix Khojoyan
 Artak Minasyan
 Andrey Movsisyan
 Eduard Glieder
 Fərrux İsmayılov
 Zaur Tağızadə
 Walter Baseggio
 Jurgen Cavens
 Wesley Sonck
 Daniel Van Buyten
 Nico Van Kerckhoven
 Bruno Akrapović
 Mirsad Bešlija
 Marijo Dodik
 Almedin Hota
 Muhamed Konjić
 Nermin Šabić
 Krasimir Balakov
 Svetoslav Todorov
 Niko Kovač
 Zvonimir Soldo
 Davor Šuker
 Goran Vlaović
 Marios Christodoulou
 Milenko Špoljarić
 Karel Poborský
 Roman Týce
 Morten Bisgaard
 Jan Heintze
 Claus Jensen
 Jan Michaelsen
 Andy Cole
 Robbie Fowler
 Steven Gerrard
 Emile Heskey
 Teddy Sheringham
 Marko Kristal
 Jevgeni Novikov
 Raio Piiroja
 Uni Arge
 Jens Kristian Hansen
 Øssur Hansen
 Christian Høgni Jacobsen
 Kurt Mørkøre
 John Petersen
 Joonas Kolkka
 Shefki Kuqi
 Teemu Tainio
 Archil Arveladze
 Shota Arveladze
 Giorgi Gakhokidze
 Gocha Jamarauli
 Georgi Kinkladze
 Levan Kobiashvili
 Marco Bode
 Dietmar Hamann
 Oliver Neuville
 Mehmet Scholl
 Georgios Georgiadis
 Georgios Karagounis
 Nikos Liberopoulos
 Nikos Machlas
 Themistoklis Nikolaidis
 Béla Illés
 Krisztián Lisztes
 Hermann Hreidarsson
 Helgi Sigurðsson
 Andri Sigþórsson
 Gary Breen
 David Connolly
 Gary Kelly
 Niall Quinn
 Yossi Abuksis
 Pini Balili
 Eyal Berkovich
 Shimon Gershon
 Yaniv Katan
 Alon Mizrahi
 Avi Nimni
 Idan Tal
 Aleksandrs Jeļisejevs
 Andrejs Rubins
 Andrejs Štolcers
 Orestas Buitkus
 Artūras Fomenka
 Tomas Ražanauskas
 Marcel Christophe
 René Peters
 Sacha Schneider
 Jeff Strasser
 Argjend Beqiri
 Mile Krstev
 Toni Micevski
 Dragan Načevski
 Igor Nikolovski
 Žarko Serafimovski
 Vančo Trajanov
 Gilbert Agius
 David Carabott
 George Mallia
 Michael Mifsud
 Ruslan Barburoş
 Serghei Covalciuc
 Serghei Pogreban
 Radu Rebeja
 Phillip Cocu
 Jeffrey Talan
 Giovanni van Bronckhorst
 Boudewijn Zenden
 Stuart Elliott
 Phil Gray
 Michael Hughes
 George McCartney
 Mark Williams
 Thorstein Helstad
 Frode Johnsen
 Ronny Johnsen
 Michał Żewłakow
 Rui Jorge
 Rui Costa
 Ricardo Sá Pinto
 Ioan Ganea
 Viorel Moldovan
 Cătălin Munteanu
 Gheorghe Popescu
 Dmitri Alenichev
 Maksim Buznikin
 Yuri Kovtun
 Aleksandr Mostovoi
 Sergei Semak
 Aleksandr Shirko
 Nicola Albani
 Colin Cameron
 Matt Elliott
 Dougie Freedman
 Kevin Gallacher
 Don Hutchison
 Neil McCann
 David Weir
 Peter Dzúrik
 Ľubomír Meszároš
 Tomáš Oravec
 Attila Pinte
 Ľubomír Reiter
 Róbert Tomaschek
 Sebastjan Cimirotič
 Aleksander Knavs
 Mladen Rudonja
 Ermin Šiljak
 Senad Tiganj
 Sašo Udovič
 Rubén Baraja
 Joseba Etxeberria
 Iván Helguera
 Javi Moreno
 Miguel Ángel Nadal
 Niclas Alexandersson
 Andreas Andersson
 Patrik Andersson
 Zlatan Ibrahimović
 Sébastien Fournier
 Johann Lonfat
 Hakan Yakin
 Marco Zwyssig
 Emre Aşık
 Yıldıray Baştürk
 Emre Belözoğlu
 Ümit Davala
 Oktay Derelioğlu
 Tayfur Havutçu
 Nihat Kahveci
 Tayfun Korkut
 İlhan Mansız
 Andriy Husin
 Craig Bellamy
 Mark Pembridge
 Robbie Savage
 Gary Speed
 Predrag Đorđević
 Miroslav Đukić
 Mladen Krstajić

1 own goal

 Michael Baur (playing against Israel)
 Raio Piiroja (playing against the Netherlands)
 Mihails Zemļinskis (playing against Belgium)
 Goran Stavrevski (playing against Slovakia)
 Igor Mitreski (playing against Turkey)

Broadcasting rights

Europe 

 : BBC, ITV, Channel 4 and Channel 5 
 : TVE-1, Antena 3, Telecinco 
 : Rai Uno 
 : ARD, ZDF and Sky Deutschland
 : RTP1, RTP Internacional, RTP África, RTP Açores and RTP Madeira

Americas 

 : ESPN, ESPN 2 and Fox Sports World (in English); Univision, Telemundo, ESPN Deportes and Fox Deportes (in Spanish)
 Latin America: ESPN, ESPN 2, ESPN 3, ESPN Extra, ESPN Extra 2, ESPN Extra 3, PSN, PSN 2, PSN Plus, PSN Max, PSN Max 2, PSN Max 3 and PSN Max 4 (all matches)
 : Rede CNT, SporTV, ESPN Brasil, Fox Sports, BandSports and PSN
 : Multicanal, VCC, Cablevisión, BAC, DirecTV and Sky 
 : ATB, Multivisión, DirecTV and Sky
 : TVN, Chilevisión, VTR Cablexpress, Metrópolis Intercom, DirecTV and Sky 
 : RCN Televisión, DirecTV and Sky 
 : TC Televisión, SíTV, TV Cable, Univisa, DirecTV and Sky 
 : Multicanal, VCC, Cablevisión, CMM, Supercanal, DirecTV and Sky
 : ATV, Latina Televisión, CMD, DirecTV and Sky 
 : Multicanal, VCC, Cablevisión, Montecable, TCC, Nuevo Siglo Cable TV, Multiseñal, DirecTV and Sky
 : Televen, Meridiano Televisión, DirecTV and Sky

Rest of the World 
 : SCTV

References

External links 
 Results
 RSSSF – 2002 World Cup Qualification
 Allworldcup
 UEFA Qualifier results with full game box scores at Scoreshelf.com

 
UEFA
FIFA World Cup qualification (UEFA)
World
World

fr:Tours préliminaires à la Coupe du monde de football 2002#Europe
lt:XVII pasaulio futbolo čempionato atranka#Europa